Sambad Prabhakar (also Sangbad Prabhakar) was a Bengali daily newspaper founded by Ishwar Chandra Gupta. It began as a weekly newspaper in 1831 and became a daily eight years later in 1839. It was the first Bengali daily newspaper. Sambad Prabhakar covered news on India and abroad and put forward its views on religion, politics, society, and literature. It was influential in the Bengali language  and in building public sentiment leading to the indigo revolt.

History 
Sambad Prabhakar was the brainchild of Ishwar Chandra Gupta. His patron was Jogendra Mohan Thakur of Pathuriaghata. It began as a weekly newspaper launched on 28 January 1831 (16 Magh 1237BS). As stated, Mr. Thakur was the backbone to this paper and his death caused the paper to close publication in 1832.

In 1836, the newspaper was revived by Ishwar Chandra Gupta and appeared as a tri-weekly on August 10, 1836. The Thakurs of Pathurighata lent a helping hand to the paper again and in 1837 the Sambad Prabhakar became the first Bengali language daily on June 14, 1839.

Contributors
 Kangal Harinath
 Bankim Chandra Chattopadhyay
 Radhakanta Deb

References

Bengali-language newspapers published in India
Bengal Renaissance
Publications established in 1831
Defunct newspapers published in India
1831 establishments in India
Publications disestablished in the 20th-century
20th-century disestablishments in India